{{Infobox officeholder
| honorific-suffix    = 
| image               = Boris Pistorius (2019) (cropped).jpg
| caption             = Pistorius in 2019
| office              = Minister of Defence
| chancellor          = Olaf Scholz
| term_start          = 19 January 2023
| term_end            = 
| predecessor         = Christine Lambrecht
| successor           = 
| office1             = Minister for Interior and Sportsof Lower Saxony
| 1blankname1         = 
| 1namedata1          = 
| term_start1         = 19 February 2013
| term_end1           = 18 January 2023
| predecessor1        = Uwe Schünemann
| successor1          = Daniela Behrens
| office2             = Lord Mayor of Osnabrück
| deputy2             = 
| term_start2         = 7 November 2006
| term_end2           = 19 February 2013
| predecessor2        = Hans-Jürgen Fip
| successor2          = Wolfgang Griesert

| party         = Social Democratic Party 
| birth_name          = Boris Ludwig Pistorius
| birth_date          = 
| birth_place         = Osnabrück, Lower Saxony, West Germany 
| alma_mater          = 
| residence           = 
| spouse              = 
| partner             = Doris Schröder-Köpf (2016–2022)
| children            = 2
| occupation          = 
| website             = 
| allegiance          = 
| branch              =  Bundeswehr
| serviceyears        = 1980–1981
| unit                =  German Army (Heer) /  Flugabwehrregiment 11
| signature           = Boris Pistorius Signature.jpg
}}
Boris Pistorius (born 14 March 1960) is a German lawyer and politician of the Social Democratic Party (SPD) who has been serving as the German Federal Minister of Defence since 19 January 2023 in the Scholz cabinet. He had previously been State Minister for Interior and Sports in the state government of Lower Saxony since 2013. He served in the State Parliament of Lower Saxony from 2017, until his position as Federal Minister in 2023.

Early life and education
His mother was a member of the Landtag of Lower Saxony from 1978 to 1990.

After taking his abitur at the Ernst-Moritz-Arndt Gymnasium in Osnabrück, he was conscripted to military service in the Bundeswehr in 1980 before taking up law studies at the University of Münster and Osnabrück University, and also, for a brief period, at the Catholic University of the West.

Early career
Pistorius worked as the personal advisor to State Minister for Interior of Lower Saxony Gerhard Glogowski in government led by Minister-President Gerhard Schröder from 1991 to 1995, and was the deputy head of his office from 1995 to 1996.

Political career
Career in local politics
Pistorius joined the SPD in 1976.

Pistorius was part of the city council from 1996 until 2013 and from 1999 to 2002 he served as second mayor of Osnabrück.

Pistorius served as Mayor of Osnabrück  starting his mayoral term on 7 November 2006 winning with 55.5% against Wolfgang Griesert who would later go on to become the Mayor after Pistorius's resignation due to his position at the Lower Saxony government in 2013.

State Minister of the Interior, 2013–2022
After the Lower Saxony state elections in 2013, Pistorius was sworn in as State Minister of the Interior and Sports at the constituent session of the 17th State Parliament of Lower Saxony on 19 February 2013.

From 2013 to 2017, Pistorius was one of the state's representatives on the German Bundesrat; from 2017, he was an alternate member. In this capacity, he was a member of the German-Russian Friendship Group set up in cooperation with the Russian Federation Council. He was also an alternate member of the German delegation to the NATO Parliamentary Assembly, where he was part of the Political Committee, its Sub-Committee on NATO Partnerships and its Sub-Committee on Transatlantic Relations.

During his time in office in state government, Pistorius was widely seen as standing out in his state for his tough stance on Islamist radicalism, terror threats, organized crime and far-right extremism.

Role in national politics

In the negotiations to form a fourth coalition government under Chancellor Angela Merkel's leadership following the 2017 federal elections, Pistorius was part of the working group on internal and legal affairs, led by Thomas de Maizière, Stephan Mayer and Heiko Maas.

In the 2019 SPD leadership election, Pistorius was a candidate for the position as the party's co-chair, together with Saxony State Minister Petra Köpping.Madeline Chambers (23 October 2019), Aspiring leaders of Germany's Social Democrats Reuters. Köpping and Pistorius came in fifth place, receiving only 14.41% of the vote.

In the negotiations to form a so-called traffic light coalition of the SPD, the Green Party and the Free Democrats (FDP) following the 2021 German elections, Pistorius led his party's delegation in the working group on migration and integration; the co-chairs from the other parties were Luise Amtsberg and Joachim Stamp.

Federal Minister of Defence, 2023–present

On 17 January 2023, Chancellor Olaf Scholz announced that Pistorius would succeed Christine Lambrecht, who resigned on 16 January after numerous political blunders, as Minister of Defence in Chancellor Olaf Scholz's cabinet. This came as a surprise to many political observers, with SPD co-leader Lars Klingbeil and Bundestag Armed Forces Commissioner Eva Högl being floated most often as replacements. The appointment was criticized, as it would mean breaking the gender parity Scholz had promised upon the cabinet's formation. A plausible explanation is that in the acute European military crisis many people, also in the Bundeswehr, thought it irresponsible to again appoint somebody without any military experience.

Pistorius was formally appointed by German president Frank-Walter Steinmeier and eventually took the oath of office at the Bundestag on 19 January 2023.

Political positions
In 2018, Pistorius suggested that sanctions against Russia should be reviewed.

In 2021, he demanded that Germany order the messaging program Telegram removed from Apple Inc.’s and Google’s app stores if it continues to ignore requests to help track down extremist content.

Amid the 2022 Russian invasion of Ukraine, Pistorius condemned what he has called Russia’s “brutal attacks” on Ukraine. In May 2022, he said that Russian sympathizers must not glorify Russia's war against Ukraine on German streets.

Personal life
Pistorius has two daughters with his wife Sabine, who died in 2015 due to cancer. He was in a relationship with Doris Schröder-Köpf from 2016 until spring 2022.
He has been in a relationship with Julia Schwanholz, a professor at the University of Duisburg-Essen, since 2022.

Awards and Honours
 2009: Order of Merit (Portugal)
 2019: Schlesierschild'' of the Landsmannschaft Schlesien

Other activities

Corporate boards
 Münster Osnabrück International Airport, Member of the supervisory board (2011–2013)
 Niedersächsische Sparkassenstiftung, Member of the Board

Non-profit organizations
 Business Forum of the Social Democratic Party of Germany, Member of the Political Advisory Board (since 2020)
 Robert Enke Foundation, Member of the Board of Trustees (since 2017)
 Aloys & Brigitte Coppenrath Foundation, Member of the Board

References 

1960 births
Living people
20th-century German lawyers
21st-century German politicians
Catholic University of the West alumni
Defence ministers of Germany
Ministers of the Lower Saxony State Government
Osnabrück University alumni
Politicians from Osnabrück
Social Democratic Party of Germany politicians
University of Münster alumni